"Elle était si jolie" ("She Was So Pretty") was the  entry in the Eurovision Song Contest 1963, performed in French by Alain Barrière.

The song was performed eleventh on the night (following 's Esther Ofarim with "T'en va pas" and preceding 's José Guardiola with "Algo prodigioso"). At the close of voting, it had received 25 points, placing 5th in a field of 16.

The song is a ballad, with Barrière reminiscing about a girl he used to know and how pretty she was. Her beauty was apparently so much that he could not love her. Barrière also recorded the song in German and Italian, as "Du gingst fort ohne Abschied" and "Era troppo carina" respectively. The song was well received in Latin America, particularly in Chile.

It was succeeded as French representative at the 1964 contest by Rachel with "Le chant de Mallory".

Dragan Stojnić version
Dragan Stojnić, a Yugoslav chanson singer, released a cover version of the song in 1965 with lyrics in Serbian, entitled "Bila je tako lijepa". The song was released on the EP of the same name. This version was a great hit in all former Yugoslavia.

Pekinška Patka version

"Bila je tako lijepa", a cover version of the Dragan Stojnić version of the Alain Barrière song "Elle était si jolie", was the third and last single by the Serbian punk rock band Pekinška Patka, released in 1980.

Track listing
 "Bila je tako lijepa" (A. Barrière, B. Stojadinović, N. Čonkić) (3:24)
 "Bumba, rumba" (N. Čonkić, S. Kovačević) (2:24)

Other versions
 Croatian punk rock band Hladno Pivo recorded a cover version of the song, mainly relying on the Pekinška Patka version.
 German punk rock band Autozynik recorded in 2000 a cover version of the Pekinška Patka 1980 version.
 In Vietnamese, the song is known as "Em Đẹp Như Mơ".
 Israeli singer Daklon recorded a cover version of the song in Hebrew, called Benativ Meurpal (On a Foggy Path), in 1998.
 Israeli poet David Avidan wrote a parody based on the song in Hebrew, performed by Arik Lavie. The parody is about a prostitute and her pimp.
 Israeli Singer Rika Zarai recorded a cover version of the song.

References

External links
 Official Eurovision Song Contest site, history by year, 1963
 Detailed info & lyrics, The Diggiloo Thrush, "Elle était si jolie".
 Pekinška Patka single at Discogs
 EX YU ROCK enciklopedija 1960-2006, Janjatović Petar; 

Eurovision songs of France
Eurovision songs of 1963
French-language songs
Jugoton singles
1980 singles
1963 singles
RCA Victor singles
1963 songs